Luzia Woman is the name for an Upper Paleolithic period skeleton of a Paleo-Indian woman who was found in a cave in Brazil. Some archaeologists originally thought the young woman may have been part of a migratory wave of immigrants prior to the ancestors of today's Amerindians, though DNA and other evidence has shown this to be improbable. The 11,500-year-old skeleton was found in a cave in the Lapa Vermelha archeological site in Pedro Leopoldo, in the Greater Belo Horizonte region of Brazil, in 1974 by archaeologist Annette Laming-Emperaire. The nickname Luzia was chosen in homage to the Australopithecus fossil Lucy. The fossil was kept at the National Museum of Brazil, where it was shown to the public until it was fragmented during a fire that destroyed the museum on September 2, 2018. On October 19, 2018, it was announced that most of Luzia's remains were identified from the Museu Nacional debris, which allowed them to rebuild part of her skeleton.

History 

Luzia was originally discovered in 1974 in a rock shelter by a joint French-Brazilian expedition that was working not far from Belo Horizonte, Brazil. The remains were not articulated. The skull, which was separated from the rest of the skeleton but was in surprisingly good condition, was buried under more than forty feet (12 meters) of mineral deposits and debris.

There were no other human remains at the site. In 2013, testing of the charcoal recovered from the stratum with Luzia's bones date the remains at an age of 10,030 ± 60 14C yr BP (11,243–11,710 cal BP), Luzia is one of the most ancient American human skeletons ever discovered. Forensics have determined that Luzia died in her early 20s. Although flint tools were found nearby, hers were the only human remains found in Vermelha Cave.

The fossil of Luzia was believed to have been destroyed when the National Museum burned, according to officials, but firefighters later discovered a human skull within the burned museum. On October 19, 2018 it was announced that the Luzia skull was indeed found, but in a fragmented state. 80% of the fragments were identified as being part of the frontal (forehead and nose), side, bones that are more resistant and the fragment of her femur that also belonged to the fossil and was stored. A part of the box that contained Luzia's skull was also recovered. The reassembly of the bones has not yet been undertaken.

Phenotypical analysis 

Her facial features included a narrow, oval cranium, projecting face and pronounced chin, strikingly dissimilar to most Native Americans and their indigenous Siberian forebears. Anthropologists variously described Luzia's features as resembling those of Indigenous Australians, Melanesians and the Negritos of Southeast Asia. Walter Neves, an anthropologist at the University of São Paulo, suggested that Luzia's features most strongly resembled those of Australian Aboriginal peoples.

Neves and other Brazilian anthropologists theorized that Luzia's Paleo-Indian predecessors lived in South East Asia for tens of thousands of years after migrating from Africa and began arriving in the New World as early as 15,000 years ago. The oldest confirmed date for an archaeosite in the Americas is 18,500 and 14,500 cal BP for the Monte Verde site in southern Chile. Some anthropologists have hypothesized that a population from coastal East Asia migrated in boats along the Kuril island chain, the Beringian coast and down the west coast of the Americas during the decline of the Last Glacial Maximum. In 1998, Neves and archaeologist André Prous studied and dated 11,400 years for the skull of Luzia after naming her.

Neves' conclusions have been challenged by research done by anthropologists Rolando González-José, Frank Williams and William Armelagos, who have shown in their studies that the cranio-facial variability could just be due to genetic drift and other factors affecting cranio-facial plasticity in Native Americans.

A comparison in 2005 of Lagoa Santa specimens with modern Aimoré people of the same region also showed strong affinities, leading Neves to classify the Aimoré as Paleo-Indians.

Researchers recreated the skull of Luzia with 3D printers by studies resumed in a laboratory of the National Institute of Technology (INT) by master's and doctoral students of the Federal University of Rio de Janeiro.

In November 2018, scientists of the University of São Paulo and Harvard University released a study that contradicts the alleged Australo-Melanesian origin of Luzia. Using DNA sequencing, the results showed that Luzia was entirely Amerindian, genetically. It was published in the journal Cell article (November 8, 2018), a paper in the journal Science from an affiliated team also reported new findings on fossil DNA from the first migrants to the Americas.

Lagoa Santa remains from a site nearby to the Luzia remains carry DNA regarded as Native American. Two of the Lagoa Santa individuals carry the same mtDNA haplogroup (D4h3a) also carried by older 12,000+ remains Anzick-1 found in Montana, mtDNA haplogroup A2, B2, C1d1 and three of the Lagoa Santa individuals harbor the same Y chromosome haplogroup Q1b1a1a1-M848 as found in the Spirit Cave genome of Nevada. The bust of Luzia displaying Australo-Melanesian features was created in 1999. André Strauss of the Max Planck Institute, one of the authors of the Journal Science article remarked "However, skull shape isn't a reliable marker of ancestrality or geographic origin. Genetics is the best basis for this type of inference," Strauss explained. "The genetic results of the new study show categorically that there was no significant connection between the Lagoa Santa people and groups from Africa or Australia. So the hypothesis that Luzia's people derived from a migratory wave prior to the ancestors of today's Amerindians has been disproved. On the contrary, the DNA shows that Luzia's people were entirely Amerindian."

Anthropometry 
Luzia stood just under five feet (1.5 m) tall; about one-third of her skeleton has been recovered. Her remains seem to indicate that she died when she was approximately 20 years old, either in an accident or as the result of an animal attack. She was a member of a group of hunter-gatherers.

See also 

Collection of fossils in the National Museum of Brazil
Genetic history of indigenous peoples of the Americas
List of unsolved deaths
Settlement of the Americas
Human remains
Arlington Springs Man
Peñon woman
Buhl Woman
Kennewick Man
Kwäday Dän Ts'ìnchi
Archeological sites
Mummy Cave
Paisley Caves
Xá:ytem
Calico Early Man Site
Cueva de las Manos - Cave paintings
Fort Rock Cave
Marmes Rockshelter

References

External links

1975 archaeological discoveries
1975 in Brazil
Archaeology of Brazil
Oldest human remains in the Americas
National Museum of Brazil
Paleo-Indian archaeological sites in Brazil
Peopling of the Americas
Pre-Columbian trans-oceanic contact
Upper Paleolithic